The Associazione Radioamatori Italiani (ARI; English: Italian Amateur Radio Association) is a national non-profit organization for amateur radio enthusiasts in Italy.

History
The ARI was founded in 1927 as the Associazione Radiotecnica Italiana (Italian Radio Technology Association) by Ernesto Montù, an early amateur radio operator.  The organization recognized native Italian Guglielmo Marconi as the honorary President of the ARI until his death in 1937.  Key membership benefits of the ARI include a QSL bureau for those amateur radio operators in regular communications with other amateur radio operators in foreign countries, and a monthly membership magazine called RadioRivista. The ARI represents the interests of Italian amateur radio operators before Italian and international regulatory authorities.  ARI is the national member society representing Italy in the International Amateur Radio Union.

See also 
International Amateur Radio Union

References

External links
 ARI official website

Italy
Clubs and societies in Italy
Organizations established in 1927
1927 establishments in Italy
Radio in Italy
Organisations based in Milan